Economics is a social science that studies the production, distribution, and consumption of goods and services. 

Economics may also refer to:

Books
 Economics: Principles, Problems, and Policies
 Economics (textbook), a textbook by American economists Paul Samuelson and William Nordhaus
 Economics (Aristotle), sometimes referred to as The Economics, a work traditionally ascribed to Aristotle

Economics disambiguation pages